Óengus mac Óengusa (aka Aenghus mac Aenghusa), Irish poet, died 930.

Óengus mac Óengusa held the post of Chief Ollam of Ireland.

His obit is given in the Annals of the Four Masters as follows- “M930.9 Aenghus, son of Anghus, chief poet of Ireland, died.”

His obit is given in the Annals of Inisfallen as follows- “AI932.1 Kl. Death of Aengus son of Angus, [chief poet] of Ireland.”

External links
 http://www.ucc.ie/celt/published/G100005B/

10th-century Irish writers
Medieval Irish poets
10th-century Irish poets
930 deaths
Year of birth unknown
Irish male poets